Caridina lanceolata is a freshwater shrimp from Sulawesi. It is widespread in the Malili lake system, including all three lakes. It can be found in pelagic swarms, as well as on a variety of substrates.

Threats
This species is currently under threat by pollution from human activities and nickel mining, introduced fish like the flowerhorn cichlid and hydro-electric power plants on the southern shore of Lake Matano. Uncontrolled harvesting for the aquarium might also pose a threat to this species.

References

Atyidae
Freshwater crustaceans of Asia
Endemic freshwater shrimp of Sulawesi
Crustaceans described in 1937